Route 78 is a highway in the Kansas City, Missouri area.  Its eastern terminus is at Route 7 east of Independence; its western terminus is at Interstate 435 in Kansas City.  Independence and Kansas City are the only two cities on the route. The highway is known as 22nd Street or 23rd Street. and Lake City Buckner Road.

Major intersections

References

078
Transportation in Jackson County, Missouri